Peter Dickson (born 22 October 1950) is a Scottish former professional footballer. He played for Parkhead, Albion Rovers and Queen of the South. He started his career as a striker but later played at right back.

Dickson played for Coatbridge club Albion Rovers where he was divisional top scorer in 1974/75. Dickson then joined Dumfries club Queen of the South on 23 November 1975 and went to make 231 appearances scoring 51 goals. Teammates Allan Ball, Iain McChesney, Jocky Dempster and Nobby Clark have all since been interviewed by the club and remembered Dickson for his contribution in the 1975–76 Scottish Cup 5-4 extra time win against Ayr United. George Cloy and Jimmy Robertson have similarly been interviewed and remembered Dickson for his off field antics.

When Dickson left Palmerston he went to play for Melbourne-based Australian clubs Green Gully and Albion Rovers.

References 

Living people
Scottish footballers
Association football forwards
Albion Rovers F.C. players
Queen of the South F.C. players
Parkhead F.C. players
Scotland under-23 international footballers
Scottish expatriate footballers
Expatriate soccer players in Australia
Scottish Football League players
1951 births
Scottish Football League representative players